The term sewing circle usually refers to a group of people who meet regularly for the purpose of sewing, often for charitable causes while chatting, gossiping, and/or discussing.

Application to sewing
Sewing circle participants, usually women, typically meet regularly for the purpose of sewing. They often also support charitable causes while chatting, gossiping, and/or discussing.

For example, in ante-bellum America, local anti-slavery or missionary "sewing circles were complementary, not competing, organisations that allowed [women] to act on their concern for creating a more just and moral society". Other examples of sewing circles include the Fragment Society, the Mennonite Sewing Circle, and those organized by RMS Titanic survivor Emily Goldsmith aboard the rescue ship RMS Carpathia: Goldsmith, "a talented seamstress, organized sewing circles to make garments out of cloth and blankets for those passengers dressed in nightclothes when they entered the lifeboats."

Apart from charitable purposes, contemporary sewing circles may be formed into organisations on a national level, such as the Guilds in Australia and America "for people who regard sewing as a creative and rewarding activity".

"Chew the rag"
It has been speculated that the phrase "chew the rag", is related to gossiping while working in a sewing circle.

Lesbian groups
Sewing circle is also the phrase used (by Marlene Dietrich, for instance) to describe the group of lesbian and bisexual woman writers and actresses, such as Mercedes de Acosta and Tallulah Bankhead, and their relationships in celebrity circles and in Hollywood, United States, particularly during Hollywood's golden age from the 1910s to the 1950s. Unlike de Acosta and Bankhead, most members of the sewing circle were closeted. This usage of the term "sewing circle" was coined by the actress Alla Nazimova.

See also 
 Golden Needle Sewing School
 Knitting clubs
Quilting bee
 Revolutionary Knitting Circle
 Stitch 'n Bitch
Dorcas Society

References

Further reading 
 
 
 
 
 

Women's organizations
Sewing
Lesbian slang